The Furman Paladins golf teams represent Furman University located in Greenville, South Carolina, and compete in National Collegiate Athletic Association (NCAA) Division I and the Southern Conference (SoCon). The Paladins women's golf team is consistently ranked in the top 25 by Golfweek.

History

Men
Southern Conference champions (13): 1970, 1973, 1975, 1976, 1977, 1984, 1985, 1986, 1988, 1993, 1997, 2004, 2010
NCAA Regionals (4): 1997 – 14th, 2002 – 21st, 2004 – 18th, 2010 – 11th
NCAA Championships (2): 1977 – 18th, 1986 – 19th

Women

Tour professionals

Men
Brad Faxon, eight PGA Tour wins, 2 Champions Tour wins
Bruce Fleisher, one PGA Tour win, 18 Champions Tour wins

Women
Beth Daniel, 33 LPGA Tour wins (one major)
Kathleen Ekey, two Futures Tour wins
Betsy King, 34 LPGA Tour wins, (six majors)
Dottie Pepper, 17 LPGA Tour wins, (two majors)
Beth Solomon, one LPGA Tour wins
Sherri Turner, 3 LPGA Tour wins, (one major)
Maggie Will, 3 LPGA Tour wins

Furman Golf Club 
The Furman Golf Club has been voted #1 Public Golf Course in the Upstate by the South Carolina Golf Ratings Panel, ranked No. 16 in Golfweek's "Best Campus Courses” in 2015 and has received a 3.5 star ranking from Golf Digest. It is also where Furman alums and professional golfers Betsy King, Beth Daniel, Dottie Pepper and Brad Faxon honed their college games.

The par-72 layout underwent a major renovation in 2008, where all 18 greens were reconstructed under USGA specifications and reseeded with Champion UltraDwarf Bermudagrass. A long-term master plan, implemented in 2010, has led to a new practice facility for the Furman golf teams, enhanced public practice facilities, new tees to accommodate golfers of all levels, bunker strategy improvement, refurbished cart paths, irrigation upgrades, major drainage installation and clubhouse enhancements. The course now also qualifies as a PGA Family Course.

References

External links 
Furman Golf Club
Men's golf
Women's golf